The No More Tours Tour was the first farewell tour by British heavy metal singer Ozzy Osbourne.

Overview
The tour was to be Ozzy Osbourne's last tour to spend time with his family, because he was incorrectly diagnosed with multiple sclerosis. Following the tour, Osbourne changed his mind and decided to keep touring.

The opening act was combo of Slaughter, Ugly Kid Joe, Faster Pussycat and Motorhead before Alice in Chains took over in the fall. After touring together, Osbourne's bassist Mike Inez joined Alice in Chains on their Dirt tour and became a permanent member of the band.

For the last two shows in Costa Mesa, the opening acts were Sepultura, and Black Sabbath featuring Rob Halford on vocals. On November 15, Ozzy's supposedly farewell set was followed by the original line-up of Black Sabbath re-uniting live for 4 songs.

Background

Personnel
 Ozzy Osbourne – Lead vocals
 Zakk Wylde – Guitar
 Mike Inez – Bass
 Randy Castillo – Drums
 John Sinclair – Keyboards

Setlist

Songs played overall
"Paranoid" (Black Sabbath cover)
"I Don't Want to Change the World"
"Desire"
"Mr Crowley"
"I Don't Know"
"Snowblind" (Black Sabbath cover)
"Road to Nowhere"
"Flying High Again"
Zakk Wylde guitar solo
"Suicide Solution"
"Goodbye to Romance"
"Bloodbath in Paradise"
"Tattooed Dancer"
"Shot in the Dark"
"Sweet Leaf" (Black Sabbath cover)
"No More Tears"
"Miracle Man" [and Randy Castillo drum solo]
"War Pigs" (Black Sabbath cover) [encore]
"Bark at the Moon"
"Iron Man" (Black Sabbath cover)
"Mama, I'm Coming Home"
"Black Sabbath" (Black Sabbath cover)
"Changes" (Black Sabbath cover)
"Crazy Train"

Typical setlist
"Paranoid" (Black Sabbath cover)
"I Don't Wanna Change the World"
"Desire"
"Mr Crowley"
"I Don't Know"
"Road to Nowhere"
"Flying High Again"
Zakk Wylde guitar solo
"Suicide Solution"
"Goodbye to Romance"
"Shot in the Dark"
"No More Tears"
"Miracle Man" [and Randy Castillo drum solo]
"War Pigs" [encore]
"Bark at the Moon"
"Mama, I'm Coming Home"
"Crazy Train"

Tour dates

References

Ozzy Osbourne concert tours
1992 concert tours
Farewell concert tours